Máté Vida (born 8 March 1996) is a Hungarian football player who plays for Vasas.

Club career
Vida joined Slovak club DAC Dunajská Streda in 2018.

On 20 August 2021, he returned to Vasas.

International career
He was also part of the Hungarian U-20 team at the 2015 FIFA U-20 World Cup.

Statistics

Club

International

References

External links
 
Official Vasas website

1996 births
Footballers from Budapest
Living people
Hungarian footballers
Hungary international footballers
Hungary youth international footballers
Hungary under-21 international footballers
Association football midfielders
Vasas SC players
FC DAC 1904 Dunajská Streda players
Nemzeti Bajnokság I players
Slovak Super Liga players
Nemzeti Bajnokság II players